Celso “Celsinho” Vinicius (born December 27, 1983) is a Brazilian jiu-jitsu  competitor and a mixed martial artist.   He has won the Brazilian Jiu-Jitsu World Championship three times.

Titles
3x World Champion (2008, 2006, 2005)
Pan American Champion (2008)
South American Champion (2009 – Middleweight Division)
Ultimate Absolute NYC|Ultimate Absolute NYC 2 Champion (2011)
World Pro Cup Silver Medalist (2011)
World Bronze Medalist (2007)

Mixed martial arts record

|-
| Loss
|align=center|5-1
| Jorge Patino
|Decision (Unanimous)
|Thunder Fight 4 - Macaco vs. Celsinho
|
|align=center|5
|align=center|5:00
|São Paulo, Brazil
|
|-
| Win
|align=center|5-0
| 
|Decision (Unanimous)
|Talent MMA Circuit 10
|
|align=center|5
|align=center|5:00
|Osasco, Brazil
|
|-
| Win
|align=center|4-0
| 
|Submission (North-South Choke)
|Talent MMA Circuit 7
|
|align=center|1
|align=center|4:45
|Osasco, Brazil
|
|-
| Win
|align=center|3-0
| 
|Submission (armbar)
|Moema Fight
|
|align=center|1
|align=center|3:50
|São Paulo, Brazil
|
|-
| Win
|align=center|2-0
|
|Decision (unanimous)
|Max Fight 13
|
|align=center| 3
|align=center|5:00
|São Paulo, Brazil
|
|-
| Win
|align=center|1-0
|
|Submission (punches)
|Face To Face 5
|
|align=center|1
|align=center|1:32
|Rio de Janeiro, Brazil
|

See also
List of Brazilian Jiu-Jitsu practitioners

References

External links

Living people
1983 births
Brazilian male mixed martial artists
Mixed martial artists utilizing Brazilian jiu-jitsu
Brazilian practitioners of Brazilian jiu-jitsu
People awarded a black belt in Brazilian jiu-jitsu
Sportspeople from São Paulo (state)
Brazilian jiu-jitsu trainers